The Vetenskapsforum COVID-19 (English: "COVID-19 Science Forum") is a self organized group of 40 Swedish scientists and medical professionals. It has  been active in Swedish and foreign media, criticizing the Swedish government's approach to controlling the COVID-19 pandemic in Sweden, from the position that the measures were not strict enough.

Prominent members of the group include the film director and former physician Lena Einhorn and Andrew Ewing, a professor of molecular biology and chemistry and member of the Royal Swedish Academy of Sciences.

Ewing received hate mail after making criticisms of the government's policies.

See also 

 Coronakommissionen

References

External links
 https://vetcov19.se/ 

COVID-19 pandemic in Sweden
2020 establishments in Sweden
Organizations associated with the COVID-19 pandemic